The 1976 Atlantic Coast Conference men's basketball tournament was held in the Washington, D.C. suburb of Landover, Maryland, at the Capital Centre from March 4–6.  defeated North Carolina, 67–62, to win the championship. In doing so, Virginia became the first ACC Tournament champion to defeat three teams ranked by the AP poll on their way to the championship.

This was the first ACC Tournament to be held outside the state of North Carolina, and only the third time that a team from outside that state won the tournament (Maryland in 1958, South Carolina in 1971).

Wally Walker of Virginia was named the tournament MVP.

Bracket

References

Tournament
ACC men's basketball tournament
College basketball tournaments in Maryland
Landover, Maryland
ACC men's basketball tournament
ACC men's basketball tournament